Verkhny Dzhengutay is a rural locality (a selo) in Buynaksky District, Republic of Dagestan, Russia. The population was 2,144 as of 2010. There are 36 streets.

Geography 
Verkhny Dzhengutay is located 23 km southeast of Buynaksk (the district's administrative centre) by road, on the left bank of the Arkaslyor River. Dorgeli is the nearest rural locality.

References 

Rural localities in Buynaksky District